Kester is a surname and given name, usually considered as a diminutive form of Christopher.  It may also be derived from Caistor, Lincolnshire, England (from Old English “ceaster” 'town' or a borrowing from Latin “castrum” ‘camp’).

Surname
 Howard Kester (1904–1977), American preacher, organizer, and activist
 Kenneth Kester (1936–2018), American politician
 Max Kester (1901–1991), English scriptwriter and lyricist
 Paul Kester (1870–1933), American playwright
 Randall B. Kester (1916–2012), American attorney and former judge
 Vaughan Kester (1869–1911), American novelist and journalist

Given name
 Kester Berwick (1903–92), Australian actor and writer
 Kester Jacobs (born 1987), Guyanese footballer
 Kester Smith, American musician
 King Kester Emeneya (1956–2014), Congolese musician
 Kester Aspden, author of The Hounding of David Oluwale

References